William Trufant Foster (January 18, 1879 – October 8, 1950), was an American educator and economist, whose theories were especially influential in the 1920s. He was the first president of Reed College.

Early life and education 
Foster was born in Boston, Massachusetts on January 18, 1879. He attended Roxbury High School in Boston. He graduated from Harvard University with an A.B. in 1901 and an A.M. in 1904.

Career
Foster was an instructor of English at Bates College in Maine, from 1901–03 and served as a coach of Bates' internationally known debate program. Foster was also professor of English and Argumentation at Bowdoin College in Maine in 1905. He authored "Argumentation and Debating", published in 1908. Foster eventually received a Ph.D. in 1911 from Teachers College, Columbia University. 

His conception of "the ideal college" set out in the concluding chapter of his dissertation, led to his appointment as the first president of Reed College. He served from 1911 to 1919. He rejected intercollegiate sports and Greek life in favor of an intense academic education. He fostered close intellectual collaboration between faculty and students. He treated undergraduates as if they were graduate students and created a system of small seminars, comprehensive examinations, undergraduate research, and senior theses.

He was director of the Pollak Foundation of Economic Research from 1920 to 1950, in Newton, Massachusetts, where he emphasized the need to protect consumer interests.

Economics 
He collaborated with his Harvard classmate Waddill Catchings in a series of economics books that were highly influential in the United States in the 1920s. His influential books, written with Catchings, were Money (1923), Profits (1925), Business Without a Buyer (1927), The Road to Plenty (1928), and Progress and Plenty (1930).

With Catchings, he was one of the leading pre-Keynesian economists, in the underconsumptionist tradition, advocating similar issues to Keynes such as the paradox of thrift and economic interventionism. The two are now rarely mentioned in contemporary economics texts, standing as they do in the shadow of Keynes's The General Theory.

Foster and Catchings rejected traditional laissez-faire economics and called for aggressive federal involvement to balance the economy lest destabilizing forces upset prosperity. The main problem was underconsumption, which could be overcome by strategic government spending in public works. The theory strongly influenced the anti-depression programs of Herbert Hoover, Franklin D. Roosevelt, and Federal Reserve Board Chairman Marriner Eccles.

See also

References

External links 

 
 
 
 Should Students Study? at Wikisource
 Should Students Study? hosted by Harper's Magazine
 Reed Magazine: What's so funny 'bout communism, atheism, and free love? (1/8)
 William Trufant Foster edited and contributed three chapters to "The Social Emergency: Studies in Sex Hygiene and Morals". The work was based on an extension course given at Reed College.
 Reed College Oral History Project Time Line
Introducing Foster and Catchings at Reviving Growth Keynesianism

1879 births
1950 deaths
American economics writers
American male non-fiction writers
Bates College faculty
Teachers College, Columbia University alumni
Economics educators
Education in Portland, Oregon
Harvard University alumni
Macroeconomists
Presidents of Reed College
Economists from Oregon
20th-century American economists